Mastostethus is a genus of beetles in the family Megalopodidae, containing the following species:

 Mastostethus abbreviatus (Klug, 1834)
 Mastostethus abdominalis (Klug, 1824)
 Mastostethus albomaculatus Pic, 1917
 Mastostethus alternans (Klug, 1834)
 Mastostethus angustalisi Pic, 1916
 Mastostethus angustovittatus Jacoby, 1892
 Mastostethus argentinensis Jacoby, 1904
 Mastostethus atrofasciatus (Blanchard, 1843)
 Mastostethus aulicus Lacordaire, 1845
 Mastostethus aurantiacus (Blanchard, 1843)
 Mastostethus balyi Jacoby, 1904
 Mastostethus basalis Baly, 1879
 Mastostethus batesi Baly, 1859
 Mastostethus bicolor (Klug, 1824)
 Mastostethus binotatus (Klug, 1824)
 Mastostethus bipunctatus (Klug, 1824)
 Mastostethus bivittatus Pic, 1919
 Mastostethus bizonatus Clark, 1865
 Mastostethus bolivianus Jacoby, 1904
 Mastostethus braziliensis Papp, 1949
 Mastostethus buckleyi Baly, 1879
 Mastostethus cardinalis (Klug, 1834)
 Mastostethus chontalensis Jacoby, 1880
 Mastostethus cordovensis Jacoby, 1888
 Mastostethus costaricensis Guérin, 1948
 Mastostethus curvatus (Fabricius, 1801)
 Mastostethus curvipes (Fabricius, 1801)
 Mastostethus cyclostigma Bates, 1866
 Mastostethus decoratus Guérin, 1944
 Mastostethus dentatus (Klug, 1824)
 Mastostethus depressus (Klug, 1824)
 Mastostethus diadema (Klug, 1834)
 Mastostethus dimidiatus (Klug, 1824)
 Mastostethus discoidalis Pic, 1917
 Mastostethus disjunctus Pic, 1916
 Mastostethus distinctus Lacordaire, 1845
 Mastostethus donckieri Pic, 1916
 Mastostethus duplocinctus Clark, 1866
 Mastostethus elongatus Guérin, 1944
 Mastostethus ephippiger (Mannerheim, 1826)
 Mastostethus erichsoni Jacoby, 1904
 Mastostethus erythrosoma (Blanchard, 1843)
 Mastostethus fecialis Bates, 1866
 Mastostethus femoralis Pic, 1948
 Mastostethus femoratus Jacoby, 1888
 Mastostethus ferrugineus (Olivier, 1791)
 Mastostethus flavovittatus Jacoby, 1903
 Mastostethus flavus Pic, 1946
 Mastostethus fraternus Baly, 1876
 Mastostethus frontalinotatus Clark, 1866
 Mastostethus frontalis (Klug, 1824)
 Mastostethus funereus Jacoby, 1904
 Mastostethus germari Lacordaire, 1845
 Mastostethus gounellei Pic, 1916
 Mastostethus gozioi Rodríguez-Mirón, 2017
 Mastostethus gracilentus Jacoby, 1888
 Mastostethus gracilis Rodríguez-Mirón, 2017
 Mastostethus haematomelas Lacordaire, 1845
 Mastostethus hieroglyphicus (Klug, 1834)
 Mastostethus histrio Lacordaire, 1845
 Mastostethus humeralis Pic, 1916
 Mastostethus humeronotatus Jacoby, 1888
 Mastostethus imitans Jacoby, 1888
 Mastostethus inornatus Bates, 1866
 Mastostethus jabaquarensis Guérin, 1944
 Mastostethus jacobyi Clavareau, 1905
 Mastostethus jansoni Baly, 1876
 Mastostethus javeti Baly, 1859
 Mastostethus jekeli Baly, 1859
 Mastostethus lacordairei Jacoby, 1904
 Mastostethus lateritius (Klug, 1834)
 Mastostethus lavatus Baly, 1861
 Mastostethus lineatus Pic, 1916
 Mastostethus maculicollis Lacordaire, 1845
 Mastostethus martinezi Monrós, 1947
 Mastostethus melanopterus Guérin, 1944
 Mastostethus minutus Monrós, 1947
 Mastostethus modestus Jacoby, 1880
 Mastostethus monostigma Bates, 1866
 Mastostethus mulier Rodríguez-Mirón, 2019
 Mastostethus multinotatus Pic, 1917
 Mastostethus multipunctatus Lacordaire, 1845
 Mastostethus nigricollis Jacoby, 1904
 Mastostethus nigrifrons Lacordaire, 1845
 Mastostethus nigripennis Lacordaire, 1845
 Mastostethus nigrocinctus (Chevrolat, 1834)
 Mastostethus nigrofasciatus Jacoby, 1890
 Mastostethus nigroscutus Pic, 1916
 Mastostethus nigrovarius Jacoby, 1904
 Mastostethus notaticollis Clark, 1866
 Mastostethus novemmaculatus (Klug, 1834)
 Mastostethus obliquus (Fabricius, 1801)
 Mastostethus octomaculatus Jacoby, 1888
 Mastostethus pallidofasciatus Pic, 1917
 Mastostethus panamensis Jacoby, 1888
 Mastostethus pantherinus Lacordaire, 1845
 Mastostethus pascoei Baly, 1859
 Mastostethus perroudi Pic, 1946
 Mastostethus peruensis Jacoby, 1903
 Mastostethus phaleratus (Klug, 1834)
 Mastostethus philemon Baly, 1863
 Mastostethus picticollis Baly, 1876
 Mastostethus pictus Baly, 1876
 Mastostethus placidus Baly, 1876
 Mastostethus plato Bates, 1866
 Mastostethus pullatus Bates, 1866
 Mastostethus punctiger Kirsch, 1875
 Mastostethus quadrilineatus Guérin-Méneville, 1852
 Mastostethus quadrinotatus Erichson, 1847
 Mastostethus quadriplagiatus Jacoby, 1904
 Mastostethus quadripunctatus (Klug, 1834)
 Mastostethus quinquemaculatus Lacordaire, 1845
 Mastostethus robustus Clark, 1866
 Mastostethus rogersi Jacoby, 1880
 Mastostethus rubricollis (Chevrolat, 1834)
 Mastostethus ruficauda (Forsberg, 1821)
 Mastostethus rufipennis (Mannerheim, 1826)
 Mastostethus salvini Jacoby, 1878
 Mastostethus sanguineus Lacordaire, 1845
 Mastostethus sejunctus Bates, 1866
 Mastostethus sexguttatus Lacordaire, 1845
 Mastostethus sexpunctatus (Klug, 1834)
 Mastostethus sigma Bates, 1866
 Mastostethus signatipennis Pic, 1917
 Mastostethus sobrinus Lacordaire, 1845
 Mastostethus speciosus Baly, 1876
 Mastostethus stalii Baly, 1861
 Mastostethus stramineus Baly, 1866
 Mastostethus suavis Bates, 1866
 Mastostethus tarsatus Lacordaire, 1845
 Mastostethus terminalis (Blanchard, 1843)
 Mastostethus thoracicus Baly, 1859
 Mastostethus tibialis (Fabricius, 1801)
 Mastostethus transversalis Lacordaire, 1845
 Mastostethus triangulifer Pic, 1916
 Mastostethus tricinctus Lacordaire, 1845
 Mastostethus tricolor Kirsch, 1865
 Mastostethus trigeminus Lacordaire, 1845
 Mastostethus unifasciatus Pic, 1916
 Mastostethus uniplagiatus Lucas, 1857
 Mastostethus variegatus (Klug, 1824)
 Mastostethus verticalis (Klug, 1834)
 Mastostethus vexillarius Bates, 1866
 Mastostethus vicinus Lacordaire, 1845
 Mastostethus vittatus (Klug, 1824)
 Mastostethus zonatus (Klug, 1834)

References

Megalopodidae genera
Taxa named by Jean Théodore Lacordaire